Drábsko is a village and municipality in Brezno District, in the Banská Bystrica Region of central Slovakia.

History
Set in the highland plateau, it was founded in 1810 after an extensive forest calamity in this area. Count Forgách, the owner of the forests, brought the first group of loggers from Orava region. Soon came the shepherds, and later on the glassmakers from regions of Kysuce and Moravian Wallachia.  The central village has been extended into further parts forming numerous dispersed communities called in Slovak "lazy" - e.g. Kysuca (originally called Otilia after the daughter of Count Forgách), Sedmák and others. Glass foundries in the area disappeared after World War I. Since then, the locals provided forest labour, some dedicated to not very profitable agriculture and the local crafts - manufacture of wooden shingles, weaving cloth and cloth rugs. After World War II people started to commute to work to nearest towns Podbrezová and Utekáč and the village began to rapidly shrink in number. The Kysuca community was depopulated by authorities in the 1980s, which means it has very well preserved wooden folk architecture set in pristine nature. The beautiful nature and peaceful environment of the whole area attract seasonal holiday cottagers and tourists.

Genealogical resources

The records for genealogical research are available at the state archive "Statny Archiv in Banska Bystrica, Slovakia"

 Roman Catholic church records (births/marriages/deaths): 1799-1952 (parish B)

See also
 List of municipalities and towns in Slovakia

References

External links
https://web.archive.org/web/20071116010355/http://www.statistics.sk/mosmis/eng/run.html.
http://www.e-obce.sk/obec/drabsko/drabsko.html
Surnames of living people in Drabsko

Villages and municipalities in Brezno District